Josée France is a Canadian former pair skater. She won the 1977 World Junior Figure Skating Championships with partner Paul Mills.

References

Navigation

Canadian female pair skaters
Living people
World Junior Figure Skating Championships medalists
Year of birth missing (living people)